Africa Independent Television, also known by its acronym AIT, is a privately owned television broadcaster in Nigeria. It operates Free To Air in Nigeria as the largest privately operated terrestrial television network with stations in twenty-four out of thirty-six states in Nigeria. AIT is also broadcast via satellite television from its operational headquarters in Abuja. AIT is a subsidiary of DAAR Communications plc, available throughout Africa, and via Dish Network to North America.

In the United Kingdom and Ireland, it was available on Sky channel 454 as a free-to-air channel (originally a subscription channel until 1 August 2016). An additional channel called AIT Movistar, formerly on Sky channel 330, ceased broadcasting on 28 July 2009. AIT International ceased broadcasting in the United Kingdom and Ireland on 15 October 2019.

Shutdown
The Founder, Raymond Dokpesi, led a peaceful protest to the National Assembly on 6 June 2019 to submit a petition requesting a review of the broadcast laws.  Raymond Dokpesi had at a press conference earlier called the attention of the media to editorial interference, threats of sanctions and political bias by the Director-General, Modibbo Kawu of the National Broadcasting Commission (NBC), who had recently contested a primary election as an aspirant of the ruling All Progressives Congress for governorship in Kwara State. Dokpesi also alleged that the NBC was working on the orders of the Nigerian presidency to clamp down on the TV network over trumped up charges of violation of the broadcast code.

The broadcasting license of the television station was suspended indefinitely by the National Broadcasting Commission on 6 June 2019 on the grounds of its alleged failure to pay license fees and use of inciting contents from social media.

A Federal High Court in Abuja however ordered the reopening of the television station on 7 June 2019.

Personalities
 Ohimai Amaize

See also
List of television stations in Nigeria

References

External links 
AIT News

Television stations in Lagos
Companies based in Lagos
Television production companies of Nigeria